First Descents (FD) is a charitable non-profit organization, headquartered in Denver, Colorado. First Descents provides outdoor adventures for young adults impacted by cancer and other serious health conditions. Brad Ludden, a professional kayaker, founded First Descents in 2001.

First Descents has served nearly 10,000 young adult survivors at over 1,000 programs nationwide. It has established relationships with more than 450 medical centers nationwide to reach patients. Beginning in 2020, FD expanded programming to serve healthcare professionals on the frontlines of COVID-19. First Descents has been recognized by CNN Heroes and Outside magazine’s Best Places to Work.

How it works
Fist Descents provides week-long and multi-day programs nationwide. These are low cost, non-clinical programs. Programs offer a variety of adventure sports including climbing, paddling, and surfing.

In 2011, First Descents offered 27 outdoor programs. 283 people participated. In 2012, the number of outdoor programs grew to 45. The number of participants grew to 515. In 2013, First Descents ran programs in 12 states and 3 countries. Over 515 cancer patients participated in 2012.

Brad Ludden, Founder

First Descents founder and professional whitewater kayaker Brad Ludden saw how young adults lack support in the cancer world when he was 12 and his aunt was diagnosed with breast cancer at age 38. An accomplished kayaker, Ludden decided to volunteer at a local pediatric oncology program by teaching kayaking. In 2001 he started First Descents.  In 2016 Ludden won a CNN hero award for his work with First Descents.

Out Living It documentary
First Descents founder Brad Ludden approached a filmmaker named Michael Brown, a three-time Emmy award winner who specialized in documenting outdoor expeditions. After hearing about Ludden's organization, Brown agreed to direct a documentary about Ludden's adventure experiences with cancer survivors. First Descents launched a Kickstarter campaign to fund the documentary, and by April 2012 raised $21,507 from 142 people.

For one week, Ludden and 14 other young adult cancer survivors spend a week together in the outdoors going on physical adventures. Brown filmed the adventures and interviewed the participants. The film was released on April 14, 2012.

Notes

References

External links 
Articles
 "First Descents: Cancer Camp For Young Adults" by Kurt Badenhausen, Forbes Magazine, October 19, 2011
 "First Descents: Free Outdoor Adventure Therapy for Young Adults Fighting, Living With, and Surviving Cancer" by Whitney Lange, American Society of Clinical Oncology (ASCO) website, January 27, 2011
 "First Descents program raises hope for cancer patients", by Sal Ruibal, USA TODAY, March 17, 2009

Organizations based in Denver
Charities based in Colorado
Cancer charities in the United States
Medical and health organizations based in Colorado